The London Underground M Stock and N Stock were similar designs of rolling stock built in 1935. As the new cars were urgently required they were based on existing designs (K Stock and L Stock). Several years after construction both types were absorbed into the Q Stock. The last of these trains were withdrawn in 1971.

London Underground M Stock
London Underground M Stock was a clerestory-roofed rail stock built for the Hammersmith & City line in 1935 and subsequently absorbed into the London Underground Q Stock, being redesignated Q35 Stock. The M Stock was based on the 1927 K stock. Twenty-eight cars were built in 1935 by Birmingham Railway Carriage and Wagon Company: fourteen were driving motor cars and the rest were trailers. All the driving motor cars were converted to trailers between 1947 and 1955.

The M Stock was the first surface stock to be delivered with air-operated doors.

Upon conversion to Q Stock, all the cars were transferred to the District line (with the Hammersmith and City Line services being operated from 1938 onwards by new trains of O Stock).

London Underground N Stock
London Underground N Stock was a type of clerestory-roofed stock built in 1935 and subsequently absorbed into the London Underground Q Stock, being redesignated Q35 Stock. The N Stock was based on the 1927 K Stock. Twenty-six cars, all trailers, were built in 1935 by Metropolitan Cammell.

M
Train-related introductions in 1935